78th NBR Awards
January 9, 2007

Best Film: 
 Letters from Iwo Jima 
The 78th National Board of Review Awards, awarded to the best in film for 2006, were presented by the National Board of Review on 9 January 2007.

Winners

Best Film:
Iwo Jima kara no tegami (Letters from Iwo Jima)
Best Foreign Language film:
Volver (To Return), Spain
Best Actor:
Forest Whitaker - The Last King of Scotland
Best Actress:
Helen Mirren - The Queen
Best Supporting Actor: 
Djimon Hounsou - Blood Diamond
Best Supporting Actress: 
Catherine O'Hara - For Your Consideration
Best Acting by an Ensemble:
The Departed
Breakthrough Male Performances:
Ryan Gosling - Half Nelson
Breakthrough Female Performances (tie):
Jennifer Hudson - Dreamgirls
Rinko Kikuchi - Babel
Best Director:
Martin Scorsese - The Departed
Best Directorial Debut:
Jason Reitman - Thank You For Smoking
Best Animated Feature:
Cars
Best Documentary Feature:
An Inconvenient Truth
Best Screenplay - Adapted:
The Painted Veil - Ron Nyswaner
Best Screenplay - Original:
Stranger Than Fiction - Zach Helm
Freedom of Expression Award:
Water and World Trade Center
Career Achievement Award: 
Eli Wallach
William K. Everson Award for Film History:
Donald Krim
Career Award for Producing:
Irwin Winkler

Top 10 films
In alphabetical order:

Babel
Blood Diamond
The Departed 
The Devil Wears Prada
Flags of Our Fathers
The History Boys
Letters from Iwo Jima (Iwo Jima kara no tegami)
Little Miss Sunshine
Notes on a Scandal
The Painted Veil

Top Independent Films
In alphabetical order:

10 Items or Less
Akeelah and the Bee
Bobby
Catch a Fire
Copying Beethoven
A Guide to Recognizing Your Saints
Half Nelson
The Illusionist
Lonesome Jim
Sherrybaby
Thank You for Smoking

Top Foreign Films
In alphabetical order:
Curse of the Golden Flower (Man cheng jin dai huang jin jia)
Days of Glory (Indigènes)
Pan's Labyrinth (El laberinto del fauno)
To Return (Volver)
Water

Top Five Documentaries
In alphabetical order:
An Inconvenient Truth
51 Birch Street
Iraq in Fragments
Dixie Chicks: Shut Up and Sing
Wordplay

References

2006
2006 film awards
2006 in American cinema